Streptococcus cristatus is a species of viridans Streptococcus with tufted fibrils, first isolated from the human oral cavity and throat. The type strain is strain CR311 (= NCTC 12479).

References

Further reading

External links

LPSN
Type strain of Streptococcus cristatus at BacDive -  the Bacterial Diversity Metadatabase

Streptococcaceae